WVIQ (99.5 FM) is a radio station licensed to serve Christiansted, U.S. Virgin Islands. The station is owned by JKC Communications of the Virgin Islands, Inc.  It airs an adult contemporary music format.

This station was assigned the call sign WIVI-FM by the Federal Communications Commission on October 2, 1978, which it held until switching to the current WVIQ call letters on July 5, 1987.

References

External links
 WVIQ official website
 
 
 

VIQ
Mainstream adult contemporary radio stations in the United States
Radio stations established in 1964
1964 establishments in the United States Virgin Islands
Saint Croix, U.S. Virgin Islands
Adult contemporary radio stations in insular areas of the United States